Kendleton is a city in western Fort Bend County, Texas southwest of Sugar Land, Texas. It was established by emancipated slaves after the American Civil War. The population was 380 at the 2010 census, down from 466 at the 2000 census. As of 2011, Darryl Humphrey was the mayor of the city.

History
What is now Kendleton was a part of William E. Kendall's plantation. In the 1860s Kendall divided his property into various small farms and sold the plots to African Americans who were former slaves. The community of the farms became known as Kendleton. 

In 1882 the New York, Texas and Mexican Railway Company established a railroad track between Rosenberg and Victoria, which passed through Kendleton. In 1884 a post office opened. In 1890 Kendleton had 25 inhabitants and a general store. In 1896 the community had two additional general stores and two churches; one was Baptist and one was Methodist. In 1900 116 people lived in Kendleton. In 1933 Kendleton had 36 residents. By the late 1940s Kendleton had about 100 residents. In the 1960s and 1970s the population fluctuated between 150 and 200 people. In 1973 voters approved the incorporation of Kendleton as a city. After incorporation the population increased to over 600. In 1990 Kendleton had 496 residents. In 2000 Kendleton had 466 residents. According to the Handbook of Texas, area residents estimated that about 2,200 people lived in Kendleton and surrounding areas.

Geography

Kendleton is located in western Fort Bend County at  (29.447872, –95.999806). Its western boundary is the San Bernard River, the Fort Bend/Wharton County line.

U.S. Route 59, a four-lane divided highway, runs through the city, closely bypassing the original town center which is now served by Texas State Highway Loop 541. Farm to Market Road 2919 runs north from Kendleton to East Bernard.

Demographics

At the 2000 census, there were 466 people, 178 households and 116 families residing in the city. The population density was 437.9 per square mile (169.7/km). There were 209 housing units at an average density of 196.4/sq mi (76.1/km). The racial makeup of the city was 12.45% White, 78.97% African American, 0.21% Pacific Islander, 5.15% from other races, and 3.22% from two or more races. Hispanic or Latino of any race were 15.24% of the population.

There were 178 households, of which 27.5% had children under the age of 18 living with them, 38.8% were married couples living together, 21.9% had a female householder with no husband present, and 34.3% were non-families. 33.1% of all households were made up of individuals, and 14.0% had someone living alone who was 65 years of age or older. The average household size was 2.62, The average family size was 3.27.

Age distribution was 29.4% under the age of 18, 8.8% from 18 to 24, 26.0% from 25 to 44, 23.4% from 45 to 64, and 12.4% who were 65 years of age or older. The median age was 35 years. For every 100 females, there were 77.9 males. For every 100 females age 18 and over, there were 72.3 males.

The median household income was $21,563, and the median family income was $35,795. Males had a median income of $34,167 versus $21,964 for females. The per capita income for the city was $12,196. About 14.6% of families and 19.5% of the population were below the poverty line, including 14.7% of those under age 18 and 28.6% of those age 65 or over.

Government and infrastructure

The United States Postal Service 
A post office opened in Kendleton in 1884, shortly after Kendleton's founding. Kendleton Post Office is located at 13635 Willie Melton Boulevard. Benjamin F. Williams was the first postmaster and also served in the state legislature. In July 2011 the USPS announced that the post office may close. Darryl Humphrey, the mayor of Kendleton, criticized the proposed closing. Cindy Horswell and Megan Ryan of the Houston Chronicle said that Humphrey "feels like his community will be erased from society if the post office is removed, too."

Fort Bend County does not have a hospital district. OakBend Medical Center serves as the county's charity hospital which the county contracts with.

Education

Primary and secondary schools

Public schools

Kendleton is served by the Lamar Consolidated Independent School District (LCISD). Students are zoned to Beasley Elementary School in Beasley, Wright Junior High School (grades 6-8), and Randle High School.

Historically the Kendleton area schools served Kendleton and surrounding communities. In 1903 the school system had 202 African-American students in three schools, and 12 White students in two schools. Previously primary school students attended the Kendleton Independent School District (KISD)'s Powell Point Elementary School, located Powell Point, an unincorporated area north of Kendleton. In 1985 LCISD began serving secondary school students in the KISD territory, while primary school students went to Powell Point.

On March 25, 2010, Texas Education Agency (TEA) Commissioner Robert Scott announced that he was closing the Kendleton Independent School District. The closing is effective July 1, 2010. Kendleton ISD will be merged with Lamar Consolidated Independent School District. Commissioner Scott's statement was, "While it saddens me to close a school district, years of effort, including reconstituting its school, have failed to turn this district around. I believe students would be ill-served if Kendleton is allowed to continue to operate. The Texas Education Agency pledges to work with the citizens of Kendleton and Lamar Consolidated to make this transition as smooth as possible." As a result of the closure, students at Powell Point were rezoned to Beasley and Wessendorf. LCISD, for a two-year period, will operate its head start program at Powell Point. In July 2011 mayor Darryl Humphrey said that his community was still recovering from the closing of Pilot Point Elementary.

Previously Kendleton was zoned to Wessendorff Middle School, Lamar Junior High School, and Lamar Consolidated High School of LCISD. Wright and Randle opened in 2021.

Colleges and universities

The designated community college for LCISD is Wharton County Junior College.

Bay Ridge Christian College was located north of Kendleton in an unincorporated section of Fort Bend County.

Parks and recreation
Fort Bend County owns and operates the Bates M. Allen Park, located just outside the city limits of Kendleton. The  park includes a canoe ramp, a fishing pier, grills, a historical site, a lake, an observation deck, two pavilions, a play area, a sand volleyball court, tables, toilet facilities, walking trails and wetlands.

In 2023 the county stated it would add a memorial to African-American settlements, which would mean much of the park would be revamped. The cost would be $4,000,000.

Gallery

References

External links

 Kendleton, Texas – Handbook of Texas

Cities in Texas
Cities in Fort Bend County, Texas
Greater Houston
Populated places in Texas established by African Americans